Austin Peay State University (APSU) is a public university in Clarksville, Tennessee. Standing on a site occupied by a succession of educational institutions since 1845, the precursor of the university was established in 1927 and named for then-sitting Governor Austin Peay, who is further honored with "Governors", the name of the university's athletic teams. Affiliated with the Tennessee Board of Regents, it is now governed by the Austin Peay State University Board of Trustees . The university is accredited by the Southern Association of Colleges and Schools (SACS) and, in 2012, was the fastest-growing university in Tennessee. In 2019, Austin Peay officially hit 11,000 students enrolled.

Presidents 
 Philander Claxton, 1930–1946
 Halbert Harvill, 1946–1962
 Alisa White, 2014–2020

Organization 

Academics at Austin Peay are organized into six colleges, two schools, and 28 subordinate departments and offices:

College of Arts and Letters 
 Department of Art and Design
 Department of Communication
 Department of History and Philosophy
 Department of Languages and Literature
 Department of Music
 Department of Theatre and Dance

College of Behavioral and Health Sciences 
 School of Nursing
 Department of Health and Human Performance
 Department of Military Science and Leadership
 Department of Political Science
 Department of Psychological Science and Counseling
 Department of Sociology and Community Development
 Department of Social Work
 Department of Criminal Justice

College of Business 
 Department of Accounting, Finance, and Economics
 Department of Management, Marketing, and General Business

Martha Dickerson Eriksson College of Education 
 Department of Teaching and Learning
 Department of Educational Specialties

College of Graduate Studies

College of Science, Technology, Engineering and Mathematics 
 Department of Agriculture
 Department of Allied Health Sciences
 Department of Applied Sciences
 Department of Biology
 Department of Chemistry
 Department of Computer Science and Information Technology
 Department of Geosciences
 Department of Mathematics and Statistics
 Department of Physics and Astronomy
 Office of Pre-Professional Health Programs
 Geographic Information Systems Center

School of Technology and Public Management @ Fort Campbell 
 Department of Public Management and Criminal Justice
 Department of Engineering Technology
 Department of Professional Studies

Buildings on the Campus

Buildings Prior to Austin Peay Normal School 
The Castle Building was an impressive "three-storied structure of red brick, with towers, fretted battlements, and casement windows set in paneled wood...".

Athletics

Notable alumni 
 Eli Abaev (born 1998), American-Israeli basketball player for Hapoel Be'er Sheva in the Israeli Basketball Premier League
Tatiana Ariza, Colombian women's soccer player, international
Major General Ronald Bailey, United States Marine Corps Commanding General, 1st Marine Division
 David Bibb, Deputy Administrator, U.S. General Services Administration
 Riley Darnell, former Tennessee State Senator and former Tennessee Secretary of State
 A.J. Ellis, MLB former MLB catcher, current Special Assistant to the general manager for the San Diego Padres
 Jeff Gooch, former NFL player, Tampa Bay Buccaneers '96–'01,'04–'05 Detroit Lions '02–'03
 David Hackworth, United States Army Colonel and author
 William J. Hadden, Protestant minister and politician
 Bob Harper, personal trainer who gained fame on The Biggest Loser.
 Trenton Hassell, NBA basketball player, New Jersey Nets
 Tommy Head, former member, Tennessee House of Representatives and brother of basketball coach Pat Summitt
Chris Horton (born 1994), basketball player for Hapoel Tel Aviv of the Israeli Basketball Premier League
 Otis Howard, former NBA player, Milwaukee Bucks and Detroit Pistons
 Percy Howard, former wide receiver for the NFL Dallas Cowboys
 Douglas S. Jackson, Tennessee State Senator, D-Dickson
 Shawn Kelley, pitcher, MLB San Diego Padres
Greg Kinman, gun reviewer on YouTube (aka Hickok45)
Kyran Moore, wide receiver for the Saskatchewan Roughriders
John G. Morgan, former Chancellor of the Tennessee Board of Regents and former Comptroller of the Treasury of Tennessee
Chonda Pierce, Christian comedian and performer
Drake Reed, basketball player, international
Matt Reynolds, pitcher, MLB San Francisco Giants
 Josh Rouse, singer-songwriter
 George Sherrill, relief pitcher, MLB Seattle Mariners, Baltimore Orioles, Los Angeles Dodgers
 Bonnie Sloan, former NFL player, first deaf player in the NFL.
 Jeff Stec, entrepreneur who formed Peak Fitness
Jamie Walker, relief pitcher, MLB Kansas City Royals, Detroit Tigers, Baltimore Orioles
 Bubba Wells, former basketball player, NBA Dallas Mavericks
 Verner Moore White, landscape and portrait artist
 James "Fly" Williams, 1970s basketball player; later in the original American Basketball Association
 Jack Zduriencik, former general manager of the Seattle Mariners MLB team

References

External links 
 
 Austin Peay State University athletics

 
Education in Clarksville, Tennessee
Educational institutions established in 1927
Public universities and colleges in Tennessee
Universities and colleges accredited by the Southern Association of Colleges and Schools
Education in Montgomery County, Tennessee
Buildings and structures in Montgomery County, Tennessee
1927 establishments in Tennessee